The Albania national under-16 football team represents Albania in international football at this age level and is controlled by Albanian Football Association, the governing body for football in Albania.

The Albania U16 football team is a feeder team of Albania U17.

The team competed in the UEFA European Under-16 Football Championship, but after the rule change in 2000s, the event had an age limit of 17.

14 Years after playing their last event, the Albania under-16 returned playing in football arena, at this time in a friendly tournament UEFA Development Tournament 2015 which took event exactly in Albania. The coach was appointed Alban Bushi, a former player and current Manager of the Albania national team. The Tournament took part from 2–5 May 2015.

History

1991 UEFA European Under-16 Championship qualifying

Group 5

Squad

The following players participated in the tournament.

1992 UEFA European Under-16 Championship qualifying

1993 UEFA European Under-16 Championship qualifying

1994 UEFA European Under-16 Championship

1994 UEFA European Under-16 Championship qualifying

1994 UEFA European Under-16 Championship finals

1995 UEFA European Under-16 Championship qualifying

1996 UEFA European Under-16 Championship qualifying

1997 UEFA European Under-16 Championship qualifying

1999 UEFA European Under-16 Championship qualifying

2000 UEFA European Under-16 Championship qualifying

2001 UEFA European Under-16 Championship qualifying

Recent results and forthcoming fixtures

2015

2017

Players

Current squad
COACH:  Ervin Bulku

The following players participated in the 2022 UEFA Development Tournament against North Ireland Luxembourg and Peru on April 9th, 2022 to April 14th, 2022 and is being held in Albania.

Caps and goals as of 9 May 2021.

Coaching staff 
Current coaching staff:

Competitive record

UEFA European Under-16 Championship Record

*Denotes draws include knockout matches decided on penalty kicks.

See also 
 Albania national football team
 Albania national under-23 football team
 Albania national under-21 football team
 Albania national under-20 football team
 Albania national under-19 football team
 Albania national under-18 football team
 Albania national under-17 football team
 Albania national under-15 football team
 Albania national youth football team
 Albania national football team results
 Albanian Superliga
 Football in Albania
 List of Albania international footballers

References

under-16
European national under-16 association football teams
Football in Albania